The 1964 Mississippi State Bulldogs football team represented Mississippi State University during the 1964 NCAA University Division football season.

Schedule

References

Mississippi State
Mississippi State Bulldogs football seasons
Mississippi State Bulldogs football